, provisionally known as , is a stony, walnut-shaped asteroid and fast rotator, classified as near-Earth object and potentially hazardous asteroid of the Apollo group, approximately 300 meters in diameter. It was discovered on 25 October 2011, by Pan-STARRS at Haleakala Observatory on the island of Maui, Hawaii, in the United States.

Orbital description 

 orbits the Sun at a distance of 1.0–2.2 AU once every 2 years and 1 month (753 days). Its orbit has an eccentricity of 0.38 and an inclination of 5° with respect to the ecliptic. Its observation arc begins with its official discovery observation by Pan-STARRS, as no precoveries were taken, and no prior identifications were made.

Close approach 

On 19 July 2015, it passed about 2.5 million kilometers from Earth (6.5 LD), attracting the interest of astronomers. The asteroid was listed as level 1 in the Torino Scale on 4 November 2011, 9 days after its discovery, but was removed two weeks later.

Physical characteristics

Spectral type 

 is an assumed stony S-type asteroid, the most common type among the populations of near-Earth and inner main-belt asteroids.

Diameter and albedo 

Bruce Gary at Hereford Arizona Observatory estimated a mean-diameter of 220 meters with a high albedo of 0.39, while the Collaborative Asteroid Lightcurve Link assumes a standard albedo for stony asteroid of 0.20 and calculates a mean-diameter of 311 meters based on an absolute magnitude of 19.9.

Fast rotator 

In July and August 2015, rotational lightcurves of this asteroid were obtained from photometric observations by Bruce Gary at Hereford Arizona Observatory and by Brian Warner at the CS3–Palmer Divide Station in California. Lightcurve analysis gave a rotation period of 0.6107 hours (36.6 minutes) with a brightness variation between 0.52 and 2.05 magnitude. This makes  one of the Top 200 fast rotator, suggesting it is a large boulder rather than a rubble pile.

Shape 

Radar observations by the Arecibo Observatory on 14 July 2015, revealed that the asteroid's shape looks like an unshelled walnut with a diameter of 300 by 600 metres. The radiometric observations also agreed with the previously 
obtained photometric ones and gave a period of 37 minutes.

Media attention 

It also attracted the media and even firms such as Planetary Resources for its alleged content of platinum worth as high as 5 trillion U.S. dollars. Commenters at StackExchange have denied these estimations as being "orders of magnitude too high", and radar observations have shown that the object contains no more metal than an average rocky asteroid.

Notes

References

External links 
 Asteroid Lightcurve Database (LCDB), query form (info )
 Dictionary of Minor Planet Names, Google books
 Asteroids and comets rotation curves, CdR – Observatoire de Genève, Raoul Behrend
 
 
 

436724
436724
436724
20111025